The Women's European Volleyball Championship is the official competition for senior women's national volleyball teams of Europe, organized by the European Volleyball Confederation (CEV). The initial gap between championships was variable, but since 1975 they have been awarded every two years. The current champion is Italy, which won its third title at the 2021 tournament.

History
The first tournament was held in 1949 with participation of seven national teams. It was dominated by teams from Eastern Europe, who at that times were strongest teams not only at the European continent but also in the whole world. The teams from Eastern Europe dominated at the tournament for next four and half decades. The first European title was won by Soviet Union, who also won two next editions – in 1950 and 1951. At all three tournaments the Soviet team demonstrated overwhelming advantage – they not only won all matches, but also didn't lose any single set. This achievement was repeated by Soviet Union at the first Women's World Championship which was held in 1952 in Moscow.

In 1955, Czechoslovakia managed to break Soviet dominance and to win European gold after 3-2 victory over a Soviet Union in a decisive match at the tournament. However, Soviet team returned at first positions after victory at the 1956 World Championship next year. At the next 1958 European Championship which was held in Czechoslovakia, Soviet Union took revenge and returned European title after 3-2 victories over host team and Poland who captured silver and bronze medals respectively.

The victory in 1958 marked the beginning of the era of dominance of the Soviet Union which lasted for more than two decades. From 1958 to 1979, Soviet team didn't lose any tournament by winning 7 European titles in a row. At the next European Championship which was held in 1963, Soviet Union defended own title after difficult 3-2 victory over a Poland in a decisive match of the final round. But at next two European tournaments – in 1967 and 1971 – Soviet team demonstrated overwhelming advantage not losing any single set in all matches. European Championships held in 1975 and 1977 were also won relatively easy as all matches ended with either 3-0 or 3-1 victories. However, at the 1979 European Championship, Soviet Union faced with serious resistance from opponents. In preliminary round, Soviet Union lost 2-3 to Poland. It was only second defeat of the Soviet team at the European Championships and also their first defeat within 24 years. It, however, affected little at outcome of the tournament as Polish team was eliminated after preliminary round while Soviet team won gold medals after difficult 3-2 victories over a Romania and Bulgaria in the final round. During these two decades, Soviet Union was not only dominant power in Europe but also world volleyball superpower by winning two Olympic titles (1968, 1972), two World Championships (1960, 1970) and first edition of the Women's World Cup held in 1973.

After victory at the 1980 Olympic Games in Moscow, a power of the Soviet team started to decline. At the next 1981 European Championship which was held in Bulgaria, home team finally managed to break Soviet dominance. Bulgaria won their maiden European title after 3-0 victory over a Soviet Union in a decisive match of the final round which was held in Sofia. The next four European Championships were marked by rivalry between Soviet Union and East Germany. In 1983, playing at home, East Germany obtained a remarkable victory over Soviets after trailing 0-2 in a decisive match of the final round which was held in Rostock and won their maiden European title. Two years later Soviet team took revenge and returned European title after 3-0 victory over East Germany in a decisive match of the final round. But in 1987 East Germany won European Championship for second time after 3-2 victory over Soviet Union in a final match. The last European final between these national teams took place in 1989 in Stuttgart, West Germany. Soviet team won 3-1 and returned European title.

In the late 1980s, Soviet Union was managed to return status of volleyball superpower not only in Europe but also in the world by winning 1988 Olympic Games and 1990 World Championships. At the 1991 European Championship, Soviet team demonstrated overwhelming advantage not losing any single set in all matches – including 3-0 victories over unified Germany in semifinals and Netherlands in the final match. It however was their last participation at the competition. Soviet national team finished its history with remarkable statistics - they won 13 of 17 European Championships (not losing any single set in all matches at 6 of 13 victorious tournaments), suffered only 5 defeats in 116 matches, with set ratio 341:43.

Following the Soviet Union's dissolution in December 1991, Russia (official inheritor of the Soviet team) continued to dominate in Europe. It's remarkable that their main European rival at those times (who became runner-up for the three times in a row) was Croatia strengthened by some former Soviet players such as Irina Kirillova, Yelena Chebukina, Tatyana Sidorenko and Maria Likhtenstein. In 1995, playing at home, Netherlands managed to break this dominance after 3-1 victory over a Russia in semifinals and 3-0 victory over Croatia in a final match which was held in Arnhem. This victory became historical not only for Netherlands, but also for whole Western Europe. At the next two editions – in 1997 and 1999 – Russia returned at first positions after 3-0 victories over Croatia in both final matches. But in the 2001 European Championship final Russian team faced with stronger resistance from the new rising European power – Italy (who became World Champion next year). Russia achieved difficult victory in a five-set match. Nikolay Karpol won European title as head coach for the record seventh time (starting from 1979 victory).

After victory in 2001, the period of Russia's dominance came to end, and more national teams were managed to win their maiden European title. The next tournament was surprisingly won by Poland while Russia (2001 European Champion) and Italy (2002 World Champion) faced only in 5th place match. At the 2005 European Championship, Polish team proved non-randomness of this success after 3-2 victory over a Russia in semifinals and 3-1 victory over Italy in a final match. In 2007, Italy won their maiden European title by beating Serbia 3-0 in a final match. At next European Championships, Italian team repeated this success after 3-0 victory over Netherlands in a final. In 2011, playing at home, Serbia managed to win their maiden European title after remarkable 3-2 victory over Germany in a final match which was held in Belgrade. The next two European Championships held in 2013 and 2015 were won by Russia who managed to beat home teams in both the final matches (3-1 over Germany in Berlin and 3-0 over Netherlands in Rotterdam respectively).

The 2017 European Championship took place in Azerbaijan and Georgia. The 2019 European Championship was co-hosted by four countries for first time – Hungary, Poland, Slovakia and Turkey. Both tournaments were finished with Serbia's success who also won World Championships in 2018. However, this winning streak was ended in 2021 when Italy managed to beat Serbia in a final match which was held at the opponent's home ground in Belgrade and thus winning their third European title in history.

The 32 European Championship tournaments have been won by eight nations. Russia have won nineteen times (thirteen as Soviet Union). The other European Championship winners are Italy and Serbia, with three titles each; Germany (as East Germany) and Poland, with two titles each; and Bulgaria, Czech Republic (as Czechoslovakia) and Netherlands, with one title each.

Among all national teams, Russia is the only who participated in all 32 European Championships (seventeen as Soviet Union). Poland took part in 31 European Championships by missing only one tournament, Bulgaria participated 30 times and Netherlands – 29 times.

Results summary

Medals table

Total hosts

* = co-hosts

Participating nations
Legend
 – Champions
 – Runners-up
 – Third place
 – Fourth place
 – Did not enter / Did not qualify
 – Hosts
Q – Qualified for forthcoming tournament

MVP by edition

1949–1983 : Not Awarded 
1985 – 
1987 – 
1989 – 
1991 – 
1993 – 
1995 – 
1997 – 
1999 – 
2001 – 
2003 – 
2005 – 
2007 – 
2009 – 
2011 – 
2013 – 
2015 – 
2017 – 
2019 – 
2021 –

Most successful players

Boldface denotes active volleyball players and highest medal count among all players (including these who not included in these tables) per type.

Multiple gold medalists

Multiple medalists
The table shows players who have won at least 5 medals in total at the European Championships.

See also
 Men's European Volleyball Championship
 European Women's Volleyball League
 Women's U21 European Volleyball Championship
 Women's Junior European Volleyball Championship
 Girls' Youth European Volleyball Championship
 Girls' U16 European Volleyball Championship

References

External links
CEV

 

 
 
Recurring sporting events established in 1949
International volleyball competitions
International women's volleyball competitions
European championships
European volleyball records and statistics
Volleyball competitions in Europe
Biennial sporting events
1949 establishments in Europe